Rutledge School, also known as Rutledge Public School, is a historic school building on the north end of 2nd St at Rutledge, Scotland County, Missouri. It was built in 1912, and is a two-story rectangular brick building with Georgian Revival style design elements.  It has a full basement and gymnasium added in 1966.  It measures 46 feet by 59 feet, and has a medium hipped roof, a double-leaf entrance with a fanlight, and projecting bell tower with the original bell.  The schoolyard is a contributing site.  The school closed in 1995.

It was added to the National Register of Historic Places in 2017.

References

School buildings on the National Register of Historic Places in Missouri
Georgian Revival architecture in Missouri
School buildings completed in 1921
Schools in Scotland County, Missouri
National Register of Historic Places in Scotland County, Missouri
1921 establishments in Missouri